It's Love is a 1955 studio album by Lena Horne, released by RCA Victor in monophonic in 1955, Horne's debut album for the company, and her first complete studio album. Lena Horne's previous album releases, from RCA Victor and Black & White Records, were collections of 78rpm singles issued as sets of three of four singles, with the introduction of the 33.3rpm album by Columbia in 1948, this format soon became obsolete. Re-issued on CD twice, in mono sound. Firstly in 1999 by RCA Victor, Japan and a UK release in 2004, together with the 1960 album; Songs by Burke and Van Heusen.

Track listing
"I'd Do Anything"  (Harold Karr, Matt Dubey)  - 2.52
"You Do Something to Me" (Cole Porter) - 2.05
"You're the One" (Billy Strayhorn) - 3.35
"Fun to Be Fooled" (Harold Arlen, Ira Gershwin, E.Y. Harburg)  - 3.28
"Call Me Darling" (Mart Fryberg, Rolf Marbot, Bert Reisfeld, Dorothy Dick) - 3.14
"It's All Right with Me" (From the musical Can-Can)  (Cole Porter) - 2.43
"Frankie and Johnny" (Lennie Hayton, Phil Moore) - 6.23
"Let Me Love You" (Bart Howard) - 3.18
"Love Is the Thing" (Ned Washington, Victor Young) - 3.19
"Then I'll Be Tired of You" (E. Y. Harburg, Arthur Schwartz) - 3.12
"It's Love" (From the musical Wonderful Town)  (Leonard Bernstein, Adolph Green, Betty Comden) - 2.10

Personnel
Lennie Hayton - Arranger, Conductor

Performance
Lena Horne - vocals
 with Lennie Hayton and His Orchestra

References

1955 debut albums
Lena Horne albums
RCA Records albums
Albums produced by Lennie Hayton
Albums arranged by Lennie Hayton
Albums conducted by Lennie Hayton